This is a list of National Basketball Association players whose family names begin with W, X, Y, or Z.

The list also includes players from the American National Basketball League (NBL), the Basketball Association of America (BAA), and the original American Basketball Association (ABA). All of these leagues contributed to the formation of the present-day NBA.

Individuals who played in the NBL prior to its 1949 merger with the BAA are listed in italics, as they are not traditionally listed in the NBA's official player registers.

W

Vaughn Waddell
Dean Wade
Dwyane Wade
Mark Wade
Von Wafer 
Clint Wager
Dajuan Wagner
Danny Wagner
Franz Wagner
Milt Wagner
Moritz Wagner
Norm Wagner
Phil Wagner
Ish Wainright
Dion Waiters
Granville Waiters
Andre Wakefield
Neal Walk
Andy Walker
Antoine Walker
Bill Walker
Brady Walker
Chet Walker
Darrell Walker
Foots Walker
Horace Walker
Jabari Walker
Jimmy Walker
Kemba Walker
Lonnie Walker
M. J. Walker
Phil Walker
Samaki Walker
Wally Walker
John Wall
Ben Wallace
Gerald Wallace
John Wallace
Paul Wallace
Rasheed Wallace
Red Wallace
Tyrone Wallace
Dwight Waller
Jamie Waller
Don Walsh
Jim Walsh
Matt Walsh
Ken Walters
Rex Walters
Paul Walther
Isaac Walthour
Bill Walton
Derrick Walton
Jack Walton
Lloyd Walton
Luke Walton
Brad Wanamaker
Wang Zhizhi
Bobby Wanzer
Perry Warbington
Charlie Ward
Gerry Ward
Henry Ward
Casper Ware
Jim Ware
Dave Wareham
Ben Warley
Bob Warlick
Cornell Warner
Jameel Warney
Don Warnke
Bob Warren
John Warren
T. J. Warren
Willie Warren
Bryan Warrick
Hakim Warrick
Chris Washburn
Julian Washburn
Bobby Washington
Darius Washington
Donald Washington
Duane Washington (b. 1964)
Duane Washington Jr. (b. 2000)
Dwayne "Pearl" Washington
Eric Washington
Jim Washington
Kermit Washington
P. J. Washington
Richard Washington
Stan Washington
Trooper Washington
TyTy Washington Jr.
Wilson Washington
Zano Wast
Yuta Watanabe
Lindy Waters III
Tremont Waters
Trendon Watford
Darryl Watkins
Jack Watkins
Bobby Watson
C. J. Watson
Chub Watson
Earl Watson
Jamie Watson
Paul Watson
Peyton Watson
Ron Watts
Samuel Watts
Slick Watts
Stan Waxman
Maalik Wayns
David Wear
Travis Wear
Clarence Weatherspoon
Nick Weatherspoon
Quinndary Weatherspoon
Kyle Weaver
James Webb III
Jeff Webb
Marcus Webb
Spud Webb
Chris Webber
Brianté Weber
Jake Weber
Elnardo Webster
Jeff Webster
Martell Webster
Marvin Webster
Scott Wedman
Sonny Weems
Dick Wehr
Brant Weidner
Bob Weigandt
Bob Weiss
Herm Weiss
Rick Weitzman
Bonzi Wells
Bubba Wells
Owen Wells
Ralph Wells
Chris Welp
Jiří Welsch
Thomas Welsh
Bill Wendt
Bill Wennington
Matt Wenstrom
Robert Werdann
Ray Wertis
Blake Wesley
David Wesley
Walt Wesley
David West
Delonte West
Doug West
Jerry West
Mario West
Mark West
Roland West
Dexter Westbrook
Russell Westbrook
Paul Westphal
John Wetzel
Robert Whaley
Ennis Whatley
DeJuan Wheat
Clinton Wheeler
Tyson Wheeler
Skippy Whitaker
Andrew White
Coby White
D. J. White
Dean White
Derrick White
Eric White
Herb White
Hubie White
Jack White
Jahidi White
James White
Jo Jo White
Okaro White
Randy White
Rodney White
Rory White
Royce White
Rudy White
Tony White
Willie White
Isaiah Whitehead
Jerome Whitehead
Donald Whiteside
Hassan Whiteside
Dwayne Whitfield
Warren Whitlinger
Charles Whitney
Chris Whitney
Hank Whitney
Greg Whittington
Shayne Whittington
Sidney Wicks
Ron Widby
Paul Widowitz
Murray Wier
Bob Wiesenhahn
Joe Wieskamp
John Wiethe
Aaron Wiggins
Andrew Wiggins
John Wiggers
Mitchell Wiggins
Lindell Wigginton
Ken Wilburn
C. J. Wilcox
Chris Wilcox
D. C. Wilcutt
Gene Wiley
Jacob Wiley
Michael Wiley
Morlon Wiley
Win Wilfong
Lenny Wilkens
Bob Wilkerson
Jamaal Wilkes
James Wilkes
Damien Wilkins
Dominique Wilkins
Eddie Lee Wilkins
Gerald Wilkins
Jeff Wilkins
Russ Wilkins
Dale Wilkinson
Mike Wilks
Aaron Williams
Al Williams
Alan Williams
Alondes Williams
Alvin Williams
Art Williams
Bernie Williams
Bob Williams
Brandon Williams (b. 1975)
Brandon Williams (b. 1999)
Buck Williams
Charlie Williams
Chuck Williams
Chuckie Williams
C. J. Williams
Cliff Williams
Corey Williams
Dave Williams
Deron Williams
Derrick Williams
Duck Williams
Earl Williams
Elliot Williams
Eric Williams
Fly Williams
Frank Williams
Freeman Williams
Gene Williams
Grant Williams
Gus Williams
Guy Williams
Hank Williams
Herb Williams
Jalen Williams
Jason Williams
Jawad Williams
Jay Williams
Jaylin Williams
Jayson Williams
Jerome Williams
John "Hot Rod" Williams
John Williams
Johnathan Williams
Jordan Williams
Justin Williams
Kenny Williams
Kenrich Williams
Kevin Williams
Lorenzo Williams
Lou Williams
Marcus Williams (b. 1985)
Marcus Williams (b. 1986)
Mark Williams
Marvin Williams
Matt Williams
Micheal Williams
Mike Williams
Milt Williams
Mo Williams
Monty Williams
Nate Williams
Patrick Williams
Pete Williams
Ray Williams
Reggie Williams (b. 1964)
Reggie Williams (b. 1986)
Rickey Williams
Rob Williams
Robert Williams
Ron Williams
Sam Williams (b. 1945)
Sam Williams (b. 1959)
Scott Williams
Sean Williams
Shammond Williams
Shawne Williams
Shelden Williams
Sly Williams
Terrence Williams
Travis Williams
Vince Williams Jr.
Walt Williams
Ward Williams
Willie Williams
Ziaire Williams
Nigel Williams-Goss
Corliss Williamson
John Williamson
Zion Williamson
Vann Williford
Kevin Willis
Bill Willoughby
Dedric Willoughby
Bob Wilson
Bobby Wilson (b. 1944)
Bobby Wilson (b. 1951)
Bubba Wilson
D. J. Wilson
George Wilson (b. 1914)
George Wilson (b. 1942)
Harlan Wilson
Isaiah Wilson
Jamil Wilson
Jasper Wilson
Jim Wilson
Mike Wilson
Nikita Wilson
Othell Wilson
Rick Wilson
Ricky Wilson
Steve Wilson
Trevor Wilson
Kyle Wiltjer
Kennard Winchester
Tony Windis
Dylan Windler
John Windsor
Lee Winfield
David Wingate
Dontonio Wingfield
Harthorne Wingo
Marv Winkler
Justise Winslow
Rickie Winslow
Cassius Winston
Trevor Winter
Slim Wintermute
Brian Winters
Voise Winters
Eddie Wisbar
Skip Wise
Willie Wise
James Wiseman
Herm Witasek
Jeff Withey
Luke Witte
Greg Wittman
Randy Wittman
Garry Witts
Kayo Wnorowski
Dave Wohl
Joe Wolf
Rubén Wolkowyski
Eddie Wollen
Nate Wolters
Tarzan Woltzen
Al Wood
Bob Wood
Christian Wood
David Wood
Howard Wood
Leon Wood
Sonny Wood
Robert Woodard II
John Wooden
Loren Woods
Qyntel Woods
Randy Woods
Tommy Woods
Mike Woodson
Bob Woollard
Orlando Woolridge
Haywoode Workman
Mark Workman
Tom Workman
Metta World Peace
Willie Worsley
Sam Worthen
James Worthy
Antoine Wright
Bracey Wright
Brad Wright
Brandan Wright
Chris Wright (b. 1988)
Chris Wright (b. 1989)
Delon Wright
Dorell Wright
Howard Wright
Howie Wright
Joby Wright
John Wright
Julian Wright
Larry Wright
Leroy Wright
Lonnie Wright
Loren Wright
Lorenzen Wright
Luther Wright
McKinley Wright IV
Moses Wright
Sharone Wright
Justin Wright-Foreman
Tony Wroten
Tom Wukovits
Dennis Wuycik
A. J. Wynder

Y

Guerschon Yabusele
Yao Ming
Barry Yates
Wayne Yates
Vincent Yarbrough
George Yardley
Charlie Yelverton
Paul Yesawich
Yi Jianlian
Rich Yonakor
Gabe York
Nick Yost
Danny Young
James Young
Jewell Young
Joe Young
Korleone Young
Michael Young
Nick Young
Perry Young
Sam Young
Thaddeus Young
Tim Young
Trae Young
Willis Young
Abe Yourist
Ömer Yurtseven

Z

Stan Zadel
Max Zaslofsky
Zeke Zawoluk
Cody Zeller
Dave Zeller
Gary Zeller
Harry Zeller
Luke Zeller
Tyler Zeller
Tony Zeno
Jim Zeravich
Phil Zevenbergen
Zhou Qi
George Zidek
Babe Ziegenhorn
Derrick Zimmerman
Stephen Zimmerman
Paul Zipser
Ante Žižić
Jim Zoet
Bill Zopf
Ivica Zubac
Matt Zunic

References
  NBA & ABA Players with Last Names Starting with W, Y, and Z @ basketball-reference.com
 NBL Players with Last Names Starting with W, Y, and Z @ basketball-reference.com

w